Robert Herbert McElroy (January 27, 1860 – January 20, 1920) was an Ontario merchant and political figure. He represented Carleton in the Legislative Assembly of Ontario as a Conservative member from 1907 to 1919.

He was born in Richmond, Canada West, the son of Henry McElroy, and educated in Richmond and at the Ottawa Collegiate Institute. In 1887, he married Helen E. Baird. McElroy owned a general store, operated a flour mill and was a grain dealer. He served as reeve for Richmond from 1897 to 1903. McElroy was elected to the  provincial assembly in a 1907 by-election held after the death of George Nelson Kidd. He also served as a director for the Central Canada Exhibition. McElroy was named registrar for Carleton County in 1919. He died of pneumonia at his home in Ottawa in 1920.

References 
Canadian Parliamentary Guide, 1910, EJ Chambers

External links 

Sudden Passing of Mr. Robt. H. McElroy

1860 births
1920 deaths
Progressive Conservative Party of Ontario MPPs
Deaths from pneumonia in Ontario
Lisgar Collegiate Institute alumni